Schœnenbourg is a commune in the Bas-Rhin department in Grand Est in north-eastern France. It had a population of 696 inhabitants as of 2019. It contains Schœnenbourg fort, a defensive structure making up part of the Maginot Line.

See also
 Ouvrage Schoenenbourg, a Maginot Line fortification
 Communes of the Bas-Rhin department

References

External links

Communes of Bas-Rhin
Bas-Rhin communes articles needing translation from French Wikipedia